Harry Perry may refer to:

 Harry Perry (musician) (born 1951), Venice Beach, California boardwalk musician
 Harry Perry (boxer) (1934–2021), member of the 1956 and 1960 Irish Olympic boxing teams
 Harry Perry (cricketer) (1895–1961), English cricketer
 Harry Perry (cinematographer) (1888–1985), American cinematographer
 Harry A. Perry (1826–1862), American actor, husband of fellow actor Agnes Booth
 Harry A. Perry (politician) (1879-1949), California State Senator for the 3rd district 1933 - 1937

See also
Harold Perry (disambiguation)
 Henry Perry (disambiguation)